Arthur Eamonn McMahon (7 May 1921 – 15 August 1990) was an Irish sports shooter. He competed at the 1968 Summer Olympics and the 1972 Summer Olympics.

References

1921 births
1990 deaths
Irish male sport shooters
Olympic shooters of Ireland
Shooters at the 1968 Summer Olympics
Shooters at the 1972 Summer Olympics
People from County Cavan
20th-century Irish people